Leonardo Bedolla Torres (born July 31, 1993, in Ayutla, Jalisco), known as Leonardo Torres, is a professional Mexican football.

External links
 
 

1993 births
Living people
Footballers from Jalisco
Association football defenders
Chiapas F.C. footballers
Dorados de Sinaloa footballers
Correcaminos UAT footballers
Pioneros de Cancún footballers
Tuxtla F.C. footballers
Deportivo CAFESSA Jalisco footballers
Liga MX players
Ascenso MX players
Liga Premier de México players
Mexican footballers